Battle of San Juan may refer to:
Battle of San Juan (1595), an English attack on San Juan, Puerto Rico
Battle of San Juan (1598), an English attack on San Juan, Puerto Rico
Battle of San Juan (1625), a Dutch attack on San Juan, Puerto Rico
Battle of San Juan (1797), a British attack on San Juan, Puerto Rico
Battle of San Juan and Chorrillos, an 1881 battle between Chile and Peru
Battle of San Juan del Monte, an 1896 attack on a Spanish magazine in San Juan del Monte, Manila, Philippines
First Battle of San Juan (1898) or Bombardment of San Juan, a naval bombardment initiated by an American fleet against the Spanish fortifications of San Juan, Puerto Rico
Second Battle of San Juan (1898), a naval engagement off San Juan, Puerto Rico
Third Battle of San Juan (1898), a Spanish sortie to rescue a blockade runner off San Juan, Puerto Rico

See also 
Battle of San Juan Hill, a land battle in Cuba outside Santiago de Cuba in 1898
Puerto Rican Campaign of 1898